The 33rd UIT World Shooting Championships was the contemporary name of the ISSF World Shooting Championships held in Stockholm, Sweden in the summer of 1947. It was the first championship after World War II.

Medal count

Rifle events

Pistol events

Shotgun events

Running target events

References 
 All WCH medallists (ISSF website)

ISSF World Shooting Championships
ISSF
S
1947 in Swedish sport
1940s in Stockholm
International sports competitions in Stockholm
Shooting competitions in Sweden